Rita Tushingham (born 14 March 1942) is a British actress. She is known for her starring roles in films including A Taste of Honey (1961), The Leather Boys (1964), The Knack ...and How to Get It (1965), Doctor Zhivago (1965), and Smashing Time (1967). For A Taste of Honey, she won the Cannes Film Festival Award for Best Actress, and Most Promising Newcomer at both the BAFTA Awards and Golden Globe Awards. Her other film appearances include An Awfully Big Adventure (1995), Under the Skin (1997), Being Julia (2004), and Last Night in Soho (2021).

Early life
Tushingham was born on 14 March 1942 in the Garston area of Liverpool, where her father was a grocer who ran three shops. She grew up in the Hunt's Cross district of the city. She attended the Heatherlea School in Allerton, the La Sagesse School in Grassendale (which later became part of St Julie's Catholic High School), and studied shorthand and typing at a secretarial school. She wanted to be an actress from an early age and trained at the Shelagh Elliott-Clarke School, before working as an assistant stage manager at the Liverpool Playhouse.

Career
Tushingham's screen debut was in A Taste of Honey (1961). In 2020, Tushingham said of the film, "We shocked audiences without intending to. I only learned later that Paul and I did the first interracial kiss on screen. ... A lot of the reaction was, 'People like that don’t exist' – by which they meant homosexuals, single mothers and people in mixed-race relationships. But they did." A Taste of Honey was banned in several countries.

Other performances have included Girl with Green Eyes (1964), The Leather Boys (1964),The Knack ...and How to Get It (1965), Doctor Zhivago (1965), The Trap (1966), Smashing Time (1967), The Bed Sitting Room (1969), and The 'Human' Factor starring George Kennedy and John Mills (1975). She also co-starred as Margaret Sheen in the TV film Green Eyes (1977).

In the 1960s Tushingham performed several plays for the English Stage Company at the Royal Court Theatre: The Changeling (1961), The Kitchen (1961), A Midsummer Night's Dream (1962), Twelfth Night (production without décor, 1962) and The Knack (1962).

Tushingham has won a Golden Globe and a BAFTA Award, and was a member of the jury at the 22nd Berlin International Film Festival in 1972 and at the 40th Berlin International Film Festival in 1990.

Later roles include the film Being Julia (2004), starring Annette Bening, and on television in "The Sittaford Mystery" (2006), an episode of Marple. She appeared in Season 2 of the BBC 3 zombie drama In The Flesh as Mrs Lamb, broadcast in May 2014. In 2020 she appeared in the BBC One adaptation of The Pale Horse by Agatha Christie.

Homages
Clips from her performance in The Leather Boys appeared in The Smiths' music video for the single "Girlfriend in a Coma," in 1987. She is also mentioned in the Franz Ferdinand song "L. Wells", the Cleaners From Venus song "Illya Kuryakin Looked at Me" and the Television Personalities song "Favourite Films". In 1999, she was featured on This Is Your Life.

Personal life

Tushingham married photographer Terry Bicknell in 1962. They had two daughters, Dodonna and Aisha, before divorcing in 1976. In 1981, she married Iraqi cinematographer Ousama Rawi, spending eight years in Canada with him before they separated. They were not legally divorced until 1996. She later divided her time between Germany and London with German writer Hans-Heinrich Ziemann, her partner since 1994.  she lives alone in London, near her daughter Aisha and her grandchildren.

In April 2005, at the age of 33, Tushingham's daughter Aisha was diagnosed with breast cancer. She recovered and later gave birth to a son. Tushingham subsequently became an activist for breast cancer health and support. She is a prominent supporter of Cancer Research UK's Relay For Life and has given a number of interviews to raise breast cancer awareness.

In July 2009, Tushingham received an Honorary Fellowship from Liverpool John Moores University for "outstanding and sustained contributions to the performing arts". In a 2020 interview, she described herself as a "lifelong football fan" and a Liverpool F.C. supporter.

In June 2022 Tushingham was the guest for BBC Radio 4's Desert Island Discs here her choices included "You'll Never Walk Alone" by Gerry and the Pacemakers, "Ev'ry Time We Say Goodbye" by Ella Fitzgerald and "Bridge over Troubled Water" by Simon & Garfunkel. Her book choice was Brewer's Dictionary of Phrase and Fable and her requested luxury item was a photograph of her family inside a book of Matt cartoons wrapped in a mosquito net.

Filmography

Film

Television

Awards and honours

Tushingham was made Honorary Associate of London Film School.

References

External links

 

1942 births
Living people
BAFTA Most Promising Newcomer to Leading Film Roles winners
Cannes Film Festival Award for Best Actress winners
New Star of the Year (Actress) Golden Globe winners
English film actresses
English television actresses
English stage actresses
Actresses from Liverpool
20th-century English actresses
21st-century English actresses
People from Garston
People from Hunt's Cross